María Dolores Castellón Vargas (16 May 1936 – 7 August 2016) was a Spanish singer.
When she was young she went to sing to the theatre Teatro Calderón of Madrid. She sang alongside her brother, Enrique. Later she appeared on television, notably A la española, directed by Valerio Lazarov (1971).

Her real popularity came with the song Achilipú(The song below).

Personal life
When her husband died in 1987 she retired. She died in Valencia on 7 August 2016 from complications of leukemia at age 80.

References

1936 births
2016 deaths
Spanish female dancers
Flamenco singers
20th-century Spanish singers
Deaths from leukemia
Deaths from cancer in Spain
20th-century Spanish women singers